This is a list of museums in the Province of Brescia, Lombardy Region, Italy.

Museums and ecomuseums

References

External links 
 Cultural observatory of Lombardy Region

.
Brescia
.Province of Brescia
.L